Martin Lamotte (born 2 June 1947) is a French actor, comedian and director. He participated in several films alongside Le Splendid. He is most known for his role on the TV Series "SoeurThérèse.com" and "Nos chers voisins".

Filmography

Theatre

References

External links

1947 births
French male film actors
Living people
20th-century French male actors
21st-century French male actors
Male actors from Paris
French male television actors